Wild Frontier is the sixth solo studio album by Northern Irish guitarist Gary Moore, released on 2 March 1987. His first studio effort after a 1985 trip back to his native Belfast, Northern Ireland, the album contains several songs about Ireland. The album is dedicated to the memory of Moore's close friend and former Thin Lizzy bandmate Phil Lynott, who died on 4 January 1986, with the words "For Philip" on the rear cover.

Wild Frontier contains the hit single "Over the Hills and Far Away", which reached No. 20 in the UK, as well as a cover of the Easybeats' song "Friday on My Mind". The Max Middleton-penned "The Loner" was originally recorded by Cozy Powell for his Over the Top album in 1979 (on which Moore performed, albeit not on Powell's recording of "The Loner"). The track was substantially altered by Moore for his own recording, thus he is credited as a co-writer.  The song "Crying in the Shadows", which was released as the B-side of the "Over the Hills and Far Away" single in December 1986 and appears as a bonus track on the CD version of Wild Frontier, was also recorded by Japanese singer Minako Honda, titled "The Cross (Ai No Jujika)", with Moore on guitar.

Gary Moore was joined by The Chieftains on select tracks from this album.

All drums on Wild Frontier are sequenced with a drum machine, which AllMusic described as Moore's "most fatal" decision, leading to a "disappointing" album.

Covers
"Over the Hills and Far Away" has been covered by the Finnish symphonic power metal band Nightwish on their 2001 EP of the same title, by Swedish viking metal band Thyrfing on their album Urkraft, and by Patty Gurdy on her Shapes & Patterns EP (2018). The Rockoutstandout reviewer wrote, "Patty Gurdy’s cover with a hurdy gurdy and vocals gives us a completely different take on the song altogether and it works very well. The echo effect on the vocals give this track that well known powerful atmosphere that the original song is able to do. I love this quirky cover and I always feel a sense of warmth when hearing the song." The Spanish band Saurom also recorded a cover of this song with alternative lyrics, titled "La Disolución de la Comunidad".

Christy Moore recorded a version of Johnny Boy on his 2021 album, Flying Into Mystery and released it as a single in November 2021. He performed the song live on the Late Late Show, noting his long time admiration for Gary Moore as a musician, and performed it following his receipt of the Lifetime Achievement Award at the RTÉ Radio 1 Folk Awards 2021.

Track listing

Note: The 12" version of "Wild Frontier" was track 5 on the 1987 CD release. There was also a double LP edition including some of the CD bonus tracks.

Personnel
Gary Moore – lead, rhythm and acoustic guitars, lead and backing vocals, producer on tracks 5, 7, and 8
Neil Carter – keyboards, backing vocals
Bob Daisley – bass
Roland Kerridge – drum programming
Paddy Moloney – pipes on tracks 1, 7 and 8
Sean Keane & Martin Fay – fiddle on tracks 1 and 8

Production
Peter Collins – producer on tracks 1, 2, 4, 9, 10 and 12
Pete Smith – producer on tracks 3 and 6
James "Jimbo" Barton – producer on tracks 5, 7, 8 and 13, engineer on tracks 1 and 2, mixing on tracks 3 and 6
Chris Porter – engineer on tracks 2 and 4
Mike Stone – producer on track 11
Nigel Walker – producer on track 14
James Barton - mixer on tracks 3 and 6
Bob Kraushaar - mixer on track 10

Charts

Album

Singles

Certifications

References

1987 albums
Gary Moore albums
Virgin Records albums
Albums produced by James Barton (producer)
Albums produced by Peter Collins (record producer)